Mahesh Bhupathi and Mario Ančić were the defending champions, but Ančić chose not to participate, and only Bhupathi competed that year.

Rik de Voest and Ashley Fisher won in the final 6–7(3–7), 6–0, [10–6], against Chris Haggard and Yen-hsun Lu.

Seeds

Draw

Draw

External links
Draw

China Open
2007 China Open (tennis)